Yasuaki is a masculine Japanese given name.

Possible writings
Yasuaki can be written using many different combinations of kanji characters. Here are some examples:

康明, "healthy, bright"
康朗, "healthy, clear"
康昭, "healthy, clear"
康秋, "healthy, autumn"
康晶, "healthy, sparkle"
靖明, "peaceful, bright"
靖朗, "peaceful, clear"
靖昭, "peaceful, clear
靖秋, "peaceful, autumn"
靖晶, "peaceful, sparkle"
安明, "tranquil, bright"
安昭, "tranquil, clear"
安秋, "tranquil, autumn"
保明, "preserve, bright"
保昭, "preserve, clear"
保秋, "preserve, autumn"
泰明, "peaceful, bright"
泰昭, "peaceful, clear"
泰晃, "peaceful, clear"
易明, "divination, bright"
易晶, "divination, history"
恭明, "respectful, bright"

The name can also be written in hiragana やすあき or katakana ヤスアキ.

Notable people with the name
, Japanese mathematician
, Japanese footballer
, Japanese daimyō
, Japanese actor
, Japanese volleyball player
, Japanese shogi player
, Japanese footballer
, Japanese footballer
, Japanese composer and saxophonist
, Japanese shogi player
, Japanese professional baseball player

Japanese masculine given names